Albert William Fisher (February 1881 – 4 December 1937) was an English professional footballer who scored 23 goals from 56 appearances in the Football League playing as an inside forward for Aston Villa, Bristol City and Manchester City. He also played for Southern League clubs Brighton & Hove Albion, Bradford Park Avenue, Queens Park Rangers, Coventry City and Merthyr Town. As player-manager, he led Merthyr Town to the Southern League Second Division title in 1911–12, and went on to manage Notts County.

Fisher was born in Birmingham, and died in Nottingham at the age of 56.

References

1881 births
1937 deaths
Footballers from Birmingham, West Midlands
English footballers
Association football forwards
Aston Villa F.C. players
Bristol City F.C. players
Brighton & Hove Albion F.C. players
Manchester City F.C. players
Bradford (Park Avenue) A.F.C. players
Coventry City F.C. players
Merthyr Town F.C. players
English Football League players
Southern Football League players
English football managers
Merthyr Town F.C. managers
Notts County F.C. managers